Francis Yuen is a Singaporean politician. He served as Progress Singapore Party (PSP) Assistant Secretary-General between 2019 and 2021 and served as Secretary-General of Progress Singapore Party since 2021. Yuen has indicated that he will lead the party into the next general election.

Early life 
Yuen is the oldest child of eight siblings in his family and was raised in Chinatown, Singapore. Both his parents died within a year of each other during his O Level examination period. Yuen signed on with the Republic of Singapore Air Force (RSAF) after his A Level.

Career

Military career 
As part of his training to be a helicopter pilot, Yuen was part of the first batch of pilots to be sent to France for aviation training. As part of 120 Squadron, he assembled the first RSAF helicopter, and also flew on his first operational flight on the Cessna 172. Failing to graduate from flight training, Yuen was selected as a scholar and pursued a bachelor's degree in business administration at the National University of Singapore, where he also attained his master's degree. He topped his classes and won several academic awards.

Yuen was then deployed to the United States Air Command and Staff College before returning to the RSAF at the Air Force Systems Command for various leadership roles.

Political career 
Yuen contested as part of a five member team in Chua Chu Kang GRC during the 2020 general election, but subsequently lost to the ruling People's Action Party.

References 

Living people
Place of birth missing (living people)
Progress Singapore Party politicians
1950 births